The 2004–05 season was Fulham F.C.'s fourth consecutive season in the top flight of English football, the Premier League. They were managed by former player, Chris Coleman, who managed to guide them into a mid-table position of 13th.

Despite not being involved in a relegation dogfight at the end of the season, they still had a big say in deciding who went down as they beat Norwich City 6–0 on the last day to relegate the East Anglians and save West Bromwich Albion.

In other competitions, they reached the quarter finals of the League Cup, where they lost to Chelsea, and also reached the fifth round of the FA Cup.

Players

First-team squad
Squad at end of season

Reserve squad

Statistics

Appearances and goals
As of 31 June 2005

|-
! colspan=14 style=background:#dcdcdc; text-align:center| Goalkeepers

|-
! colspan=14 style=background:#dcdcdc; text-align:center| Defenders

|-
! colspan=14 style=background:#dcdcdc; text-align:center| Midfielders

|-
! colspan=14 style=background:#dcdcdc; text-align:center| Forwards

|}

Starting 11
Considering starts in all competitions
 GK: #1,  Edwin van der Sar, 39
 RB: #2,  Moritz Volz, 36
 CB: #6,  Zat Knight, 42
 CB: #21,  Zesh Rehman, 21 (#37,  Liam Rosenior, also has 21 starts)
 LB: #3,  Carlos Bocanegra, 33
 CM: #4,  Steed Malbranque, 27
 CM: #14,  Papa Bouba Diop, 35
 CM: #7,  Mark Pembridge, 31
 RF: #11,  Luís Boa Morte, 37
 CF: #9,  Andy Cole, 37
 LF: #17,  Tomasz Radzinski, 31

Transfers
In

Out

Competitions

Overall
Premier League: 13th
League Cup: Quarter-finals
FA Cup: Fifth round

Premier League

Premier League table

Results summary

Results by round

Results

Premier League

League Cup

FA Cup

References

Notes

External links
 Official Fulham website
 Statistics from Soccerbase

Fulham F.C. seasons
Fulham